Laevaricella is a genus of tropical, air-breathing land snails, terrestrial pulmonate gastropod mollusks in the family Oleacinidae.

Species 
Species within the genus Laevaricella include:
 Laevaricella glabra (Pfeiffer, 1846)
 Laevaricella guadeloupensis (Pfeiffer, 1856)
 Laevaricella interrupta (Shuttleworth, 1854)
 Laevaricella perlucens (Guppy, 1868)
 Laevaricella semitarum (Pfeiffer, 1842) - type species
 Laevaricella playa H. B. Baker, 1940 - photo

References

Oleacinidae